State Normal Library, also known as the Normal Hall, is a historic library building located on the campus of Indiana State University at Terre Haute, Vigo County, Indiana. It was built between 1907 and 1909, and is a three-story, Classical Revival style brick and limestone building. An addition was constructed in 1957, creating an "L"-plan.  The front facade features five engaged fluted, Ionic order columns.

It was listed on the National Register of Historic Places in 2002.

References

University and college buildings on the National Register of Historic Places in Indiana
Libraries on the National Register of Historic Places in Indiana
Neoclassical architecture in Indiana
Library buildings completed in 1909
Buildings and structures in Terre Haute, Indiana
National Register of Historic Places in Terre Haute, Indiana